The Table of General Standard Chinese Characters is the current standard list of 8,105 Chinese characters published by the government of the People's Republic of China and promulgated in June 2013. Of the characters included, 3,500 are in Tier I and designated as frequently used characters, a reduction from the 7,000 in the earlier List of Commonly Used Characters in Modern Chinese; Tier II includes 3,000 characters that are designated as commonly used characters but less frequently used than those in Tier 1; Tier III includes characters commonly used as names and terminology. The list also offers a table of correspondences between 2,546 Simplified Chinese characters and 2,574 Traditional Chinese characters, along with other selected variant forms, effectively serving as Mainland China's standardization scheme for Traditional Characters.

Non-BMP characters 
In Unicode, some characters in the Table of General Standard Chinese Characters are located outside of the Basic Multilingual Plane (BMP).

See also 
 The Table of General Standard Chinese Characters with Mandarin readings
 Pinyin reading index for the Table of General Standard Chinese Characters
 The First Series of Standardized Forms of Words with Non-standardized Variant Forms

References

External links 

Chinese characters